Tømmerneset is a village in the municipality of Hamarøy in Nordland county, Norway. Tømmerneset is the site of Tømmernes Church. The village area is located where County Road 835 (and the Steigen Tunnel) branches off from the European Road E6 highway.

Archaeology
There is rock art dating to the Stone Age "near the bridge over Sagelva".

See also
Rock art at an eponymous place in another county

References

Hamarøy
Villages in Nordland
Populated places of Arctic Norway